Jack Williams (born April 22, 2000) is an American archer. He competed in the men's individual event at the 2020 Summer Olympics held in Tokyo, Japan. Two months later, he won the silver medal in the men's team event at the 2021 World Archery Championships held in Yankton, United States. The following weekend he competed at the 2021 Hyundai World Archery World Cup Final, and became the first archer appearing at the season-ending event as a host representative to take gold.

References

External links
 

2000 births
Living people
American male archers
Olympic archers of the United States
Archers at the 2020 Summer Olympics
Place of birth missing (living people)
Archers at the 2019 Pan American Games
Pan American Games medalists in archery
Medalists at the 2019 Pan American Games
World Archery Championships medalists
21st-century American people
Pan American Games bronze medalists for the United States